The 2001 Sparkassen Cup (tennis) was a women's tennis tournament played on indoor hard courts in Leipzig, Germany. It was part of the Tier II category of the 2001 WTA Tour. The tournament was held from 24 September until 30 September 2002. First-seeded Kim Clijsters won the singles title and earned $90,000 first-prize money.

Singles main draw entrants

Seeds

Other entrants
The following players received wildcards into the singles main draw:
  Květa Hrdlickova
  Jana Kandarr
  Iva Majoli

The following players received entry from the singles qualifying draw:
  Daniela Hantuchová
  Tatiana Panova
  Barbara Rittner
  Barbara Schwartz

The following players received entry as lucky losers into the singles main draw:
  Anastasia Myskina

Doubles main draw entrants

Seeds

Other entrants
The following pairs received wildcards into the doubles main draw:
  Martina Müller /  Silvija Talaja

The following pairs received entry from the singles qualifying draw:
  Marta Marrero /  Francesca Schiavone

Finals

Singles

  Kim Clijsters defeated  Magdalena Maleeva, 6–1, 6–1

Doubles

  Elena Likhovtseva /  Nathalie Tauziat defeated  Květa Hrdlickova /  Barbara Rittner, 6–4, 6–2

References

External links
 ITF tournament edition details
 2001 Sparkassen Cup draws

Sparkassen Cup
Sparkassen Cup (tennis)
German